John Cushley (21 January 1943 – 24 March 2008) was a Scottish footballer who played for Celtic, West Ham United, Dunfermline Athletic and Dumbarton.

He was born in 1943 in Hamilton, South Lanarkshire, and joined Celtic in July 1960 as a centre-half in the team's reserves. He made his first team debut for Celtic in March 1963, in a match against Kilmarnock at Rugby Park. Cushley found himself in the shadow of his teammate and former schoolmate, Billy McNeill, and many of his appearances for Celtic were dependent on McNeill's absence due to injury or international appearances. Nonetheless, Cushley played 41 games for Celtic, until he left the club in 1967 in a £10,000 transfer to West Ham United.

As well as his football career, Cushley was a graduate in modern languages from the University of Glasgow and worked as a teacher. In 1964, he acted as a Spanish translator when he and team manager Jimmy McGrory travelled to Spain in an unsuccessful attempt to sign Real Madrid legend Alfredo Di Stéfano to Celtic. During his two years in London with West Ham, Cushley also worked as a teacher.

In 1970, he returned to Scotland, playing for Dunfermline Athletic and Dumbarton before retiring in 1976. He continued teaching, and joined Celtic's coaching staff as an education officer.

In 2007, Cushley was diagnosed with motor neurone disease, the same illness that had claimed his Celtic teammate Jimmy Johnstone in 2006. He died at his home in Bothwell on 24 March 2008, aged 65.

References

1943 births
2008 deaths
Association football central defenders
Scottish footballers
Celtic F.C. players
West Ham United F.C. players
Dunfermline Athletic F.C. players
Dumbarton F.C. players
Scottish Football League players
English Football League players
Celtic F.C. non-playing staff
Clyde F.C. non-playing staff
Alumni of the University of Glasgow
Neurological disease deaths in Scotland
Deaths from motor neuron disease
Blantyre Celtic F.C. players
Scottish Junior Football Association players